Pyromaia is a genus of crab in the family Inachoididae, containing the following species:
Pyromaia acanthina Lemaitre, Campos & Bermúdez, 2001
Pyromaia arachna Rathbun, 1924
Pyromaia cuspidata Stimpson, 1871
Pyromaia mexicana Rathbun, 1893
Pyromaia propinqua Chace, 1940
Pyromaia tuberculata (Lockington, 1877)
Pyromaia vogelsangi Türkay, 1968

References

Majoidea